Niel Otto (born 9 May 1997) is a South African rugby union player for the  in the Currie Cup. His regular position is flanker.

Otto was named in the  squad for the 2021 Currie Cup Premier Division. He made his debut for Western Province in Round 1 of the 2021 Currie Cup Premier Division against .

References

South African rugby union players
1997 births
Living people
Rugby union flankers
Western Province (rugby union) players
Sharks (Currie Cup) players
Pumas (Currie Cup) players
Griquas (rugby union) players